Anthony Olusanya (born 1 February 2000) is a Finnish professional footballer who plays as a forward for Veikkausliiga club HJK.

Club career
On 30 September 2021, in a UEFA Europa Conference League group phase game against Alashkert, he came on as a late substitute for Roope Riski and scored his first goal in a European club competition. HJK eventually won 4–2.

International career
Born in Jakobstad, Finland, Olusanya is of Nigerian descent on his father's side but does not have Nigerian citizenship. His mother is of Finnish background.

He made his debut for the Finland U-21 team on 3 June 2021 in a friendly match against Sweden U-21. He then scored his first international goal against Estonia U-21 on 3 September 2021 in an Under-21 European Championship qualifier.

References

External links
 

2000 births
Living people
People from Jakobstad
Finnish footballers
Finland international footballers
Finland under-21 international footballers
Finnish people of Nigerian descent
Association football forwards
FF Jaro players
Helsingin Jalkapalloklubi players
Veikkausliiga players